Tom Towles (March 20, 1950 – April 2, 2015) was an American character actor of film, theatre, and television, known for his portraying villains and intimidating supporting characters. His breakthrough role as Otis in Henry: Portrait of a Serial Killer (1986) earned him an Independent Spirit Award nomination for Best Supporting Male. He appeared in numerous films and television series including Night of the Living Dead, Blood In Blood Out, The Rock, NYPD Blue, Dr. Dolittle, The Devil's Rejects, Miami Vice, and Malcolm in the Middle.

Early life
Towles was born on March 20, 1950 in Chicago, Illinois. He had a sister by the name of Kai. Prior to acting, Towles briefly served in the United States Marine Corps.

Career
In 1971, Towles began his acting career in Chicago where he performed as a member of the Organic Theater Company. He made his film debut portraying a minor role as a cop in Dog Day Afternoon (1975). Afterwards, Towles returned to Chicago to continue performing with the Organic Theater Company, as well as performing at the Goodman Theatre. After a decade-long hiatus, Towles returned to the screen in the film Pink Nights (1985).

Towles made his breakthrough role as Otis in Henry: Portrait of a Serial Killer. His character was based on real-life serial killer Ottis Toole.

Towles also appeared on television in such shows as Seinfeld, NYPD Blue, L.A. Law, ER, Star Trek: Deep Space Nine, Star Trek: Voyager and Firefly.

Towles frequently collaborated with filmmaker Rob Zombie in several of films such as House of 1000 Corpses (2003), The Devil's Rejects (2005), Halloween (2007) and Grindhouse (2007).

Death
Towles died on April 2, 2015, at the age of 65, in a hospital in Pinellas, Florida of complications following a stroke.

Filmography

Film

Television

Video games

References

External links

1950 births
2015 deaths
Male actors from Chicago
American male film actors
American male television actors
American male stage actors
20th-century American male actors
21st-century American male actors
United States Marines